Anass Aït El Abdia (born 21 March 1993) is a Moroccan cyclist, who rides for Emirati amateur team Al Shafar Jumeirah Cycling Team. He previously rode for UCI WorldTeam  from 2017 until 2018. He was named in the startlist for the 2017 Vuelta a España, but he crashed out on stage 2.

Major results

2012
 Challenge du Prince
4th Trophée de la Maison Royale
8th Trophée Princier
 8th Challenge Ben Guerir, Challenge des phosphates
 10th Grand Prix Al Massira, Les Challenges de la Marche Verte
2013
 1st  Young rider classification Tour d'Algérie
 Les Challenges de la Marche Verte
2nd Grand Prix Al Massira
3rd Grand Prix Sakia El Hamra
 Challenge du Prince
4th Trophée Princier
5th Trophée de l'Anniversaire
 5th Grand Prix Oued Eddahab, Les Challenges de la Marche Verte
2014
 4th Overall Tour de Constantine
1st Young rider classification
 Challenge du Prince
4th Trophée Princier
5th Trophée de l'Anniversaire
 9th Overall Tour du Maroc
1st Stage 5
 9th Critérium International de Sétif
2015
 National Road Championships
1st  Under-23 time trial
3rd Time trial
 Challenge du Prince
1st Trophée de la Maison Royale
3rd Trophée Princier
3rd Trophée de l'Anniversaire
 3rd Overall Tour du Maroc
1st  Young rider classification
 Les Challenges de la Marche Verte
3rd Grand Prix Oued Eddahab
3rd Grand Prix Al Massira
4th Grand Prix Sakia El Hamra
 Challenge des phosphates
3rd Grand Prix de Khouribga
8th Grand Prix Fkih Ben Saleh
8th Grand Prix de Ben Guerir
 9th Overall Tour d'Egypte
1st  Young rider classification
 9th Overall Grand Prix Chantal Biya
2016
 1st  Road race, National Road Championships
 6th Overall Tour de Côte d'Ivoire
2017
 1st  Overall Tour du Maroc
2019
 2nd Overall Tour of Mesopotamia
 4th Overall Tour of Mersin
 10th Prueba Villafranca de Ordizia
2021
 10th Germenica Grand Prix
2022
 Tour of Sharjah
1st  Mountains classification 
1st Stage 2
 2nd Road race, National Road Championships
 7th Grand Prix Yahyalı
 8th Overall Tour du Cameroun
1st Points classification
1st Mountains classification
 8th Road race, Mediterranean Games
 9th Road race, Islamic Solidarity Games

Grand Tour general classification results timeline

References

External links

1993 births
Living people
Moroccan male cyclists
Cyclists at the 2016 Summer Olympics
Olympic cyclists of Morocco
Sportspeople from Casablanca